Spinosi is a surname. Notable people with the surname include:

Jean-Christophe Spinosi (born 1964), French conductor and violinist
Laurent Spinosi (born 1969), French goalkeeper and coach
Luciano Spinosi (born 1950), Italian footballer and coach
Mathieu Spinosi (born 1990), French actor